The Paradise Valley Ranger Station, located at 355 S. Main St. in Paradise Valley, serves a district of the Humboldt-Toiyabe National Forest in Humboldt County, northwestern Nevada.  It has also been known as the Paradise Valley Guard Station.

History
The ranger station was built in 1933 in an American Craftsman Bungalow style.  It was designed by the U.S. Forest Service architects and built by the Civilian Conservation Corps−CCC for the then named Humboldt National Forest].

The construction of the ranger station building started in 1934 by the Civilian Conservation Corps was halted for several years but the work was resumed and completed in 1941.

National Register of Historic Places
The building was deemed significant as a product of the National Forest Service's work with the Civilian Conservation Corps, a government jobs program of the Great Depression.  It was listed on the National Register of Historic Places in 1996.  The listing included seven contributing buildings and one other contributing structure.

Present day
Currently, the station is run by the United States Forest Service for the Santa Rosa Range District of the Humboldt-Toiyabe National Forest, in Nevada.

See also

References

Buildings and structures in Humboldt County, Nevada
Humboldt–Toiyabe National Forest
Ranger stations in the United States
Government buildings completed in 1933
Government buildings on the National Register of Historic Places in Nevada
Historic districts on the National Register of Historic Places in Nevada
National Register of Historic Places in Humboldt County, Nevada
American Craftsman architecture in Nevada
Bungalow architecture in Nevada
Civilian Conservation Corps in Nevada